Giuseppe Domenico Donna (30 June 1883 – 21 August 1961) was an Italian footballer and lawyer.

Biography 
A high school student in Turin at Liceo Massimo d'Azeglio, Donna (who later became a lawyer) was first known as a lively and fast striker, co-founding Juventus in 1897.

Career 
He was among the founding members and among the first players of Juventus, in which he had the role of right winger. He made his debut in an official match on 11 March 1900 against Turin, a 1–0 loss. His last appearance for the club was against Turin, a 3–1 defeat. During his 11 Juventus seasons he collected 30 appearances and 10 goals, and in 1905 he was among the protagonists of the club's first Italian title, in the Prima Categoria.

On 17 April 1904, he also participated in the final of the first edition of the Seconda Categoria tournament for reserves — a sort of Serie B ante litteram championship, against Genoa, a 4–0 defeat.

Personal life 
Prior to World War II, Donna was exiled to Villeurbanne for political reasons.

Career statistics

Honours 
Juventus

 Prima Categoria: 1905

Juventus II

 Seconda Categoria: 1905

References 

1883 births
1961 deaths
Italian footballers
Juventus F.C. players
20th-century Italian lawyers
Association football forwards
Footballers from Turin